The Spanking Age is a 1928 Our Gang short silent comedy film directed by Robert F. McGowan. It was the 80th Our Gang short that was released. The film was considered lost until a copy surfaced in 1990.

Plot
Mary Ann and Wheezer are the children of a widowed inventor who are forced to endure the cruelties of their stepmother (Lyle Tayo) and stepsister. The kids get even by rigging a few clever contraptions of their own. In the end the father sells a patent worth millions and thereby leaves the stepmother and stepdaughter.

Cast

The Gang
 Mary Ann Jackson as Mary Ann
 Bobby Hutchins as Wheezer
 Jean Darling as Jean, the stepsister
 Joe Cobb as Joe
 Allen Hoskins as Farina
 Harry Spear as Harry
 Pete the Pup as Petie

Additional cast
 Lyle Tayo as Stepmother

References

External links

1928 films
1928 comedy films
1928 short films
1920s rediscovered films
American silent short films
American black-and-white films
Films directed by Robert F. McGowan
Metro-Goldwyn-Mayer short films
Our Gang films
Rediscovered American films
Silent American comedy films
1920s American films
1920s English-language films